Freakstock  is an annual Christian festival held by members of the German Jesus Freaks movement. First held in Wiesbaden in 1995, the festival was moved to Gotha in 1997. Over 8000 people attend annually. The festival presents many varieties of Christian music and includes teaching and praise and worship sessions.

External links
 Freakstock homepage
 JFI - Jesus Freaks international registered association 
 Jesusrockrecords - the label of the Jesusfreaks
 German Television report of Freakstock 2005
 report of Freakstock 2006  with jesus.de and an interview  with Jesus Freak founder Martin Dreyer.

Evangelical Christian music festivals
Music festivals in Germany